Stefan Witwicki (September 13, 1801April 15, 1847) was a Polish poet of the Romantic period.

Life
From 1822 Witwicki worked in the Congress Poland's Government Commission on Religions and Education (Komisja Rządowa Wyznań i Oświaty).

In 1832 he emigrated of his own free will to Paris, France, where he became a friend of the Polish poet Adam Mickiewicz.

He was a friend of Frédéric Chopin, who dedicated his Mazurkas, Op. 41 to him, and who also set ten of his texts as Polish songs.

Works
Witwicki wrote: 
lyrics, including the popular Piosenki sielskie (Idyllic Songs, 1830), which have been set to music by Frédéric Chopin (see Polish songs by Frédéric Chopin), Stanisław Moniuszko and others; 
a cycle of paraphrases, Poezje biblijne (Biblical Poems, 1830); 
a dramatic poem, Edmund (1829); and 
an encomium to traditionalism, in his prose writings, Wieczory pielgrzyma (A Pilgrim's Evenings, 1837–42; enlarged edition, 1844–45).

See also
 List of Poles

References
"Witwicki, Stefan," Encyklopedia powszechna PWN (PWN Universal Encyclopedia), Warsaw, Państwowe Wydawnictwo Naukowe, vol. 4, 1976, p. 665.

1801 births
1847 deaths
Polish poets
19th-century Polish poets